Brightlands School (or Brightlands) is a private school located in the Curzon Road suburb of Dehradun, Uttarakhand, India. Brightlands was established in 1958 by Mrs Narang as a school for primary students. After her demise, her son Ravi Narang took over the school. Ravi Narang died on 28 December 2020. The school was started in Dalanwala where Windlass Apartments now stands, till it moved to Kasturba road, also known as Curzon road. It is a 10+2 senior-secondary level, English medium, co-educational school affiliated to the Council for the Indian School Certificate Examinations, New Delhi.

References

Private schools in Uttarakhand
Primary schools in India
High schools and secondary schools in Uttarakhand
Schools in Dehradun
Educational institutions established in 1958
1958 establishments in Uttar Pradesh